Carex multicaulis is a species of sedge known by the common name manystem sedge. It is native to California, western Nevada, and southern Oregon, where it grows in chaparral and open forest montane habitats.

Description
This reedlike sedge produces clumps of narrow stems up to 50 or 60 centimeters tall, with short, folded or rolled leaves. The inflorescence is a narrow cluster of spike-shaped staminate flowers above a cluster of more rounded pistillate flowers.

External links
Jepson Manual Treatment — Carex multicaulis
USDA Plants Profile: Carex multicaulis
Flora of North America
Carex multicaulis — U.C. Photo gallery

multicaulis
Flora of California
Flora of Nevada
Flora of Oregon
Flora of the Sierra Nevada (United States)
Natural history of the California Coast Ranges
Natural history of the Peninsular Ranges
Natural history of the Transverse Ranges
~
~
Plants described in 1884
Flora without expected TNC conservation status
Taxa named by Liberty Hyde Bailey